Tor Gjesdal (24 October 1909 – 3 July 1973) was a Norwegian journalist and civil servant. He was born in Dypvåg, and grew up in Sandnes. He was a journalist in the newspaper 1ste Mai from 1929, and for Arbeiderbladet from 1936. During World War II he was press counsellor for the Norwegian government-in-exile in London. From 1946 he worked for the United Nations. He was decorated Knight, First Class of the Order of St. Olav in 1960, and Commander in 1970.

References

1909 births
1973 deaths
People from Tvedestrand
People from Sandnes
Norwegian civil servants
20th-century Norwegian writers
20th-century Norwegian journalists